Emirates Towers is a rapid transit station on the Red Line of the Dubai Metro in Dubai.

History
Emirates Towers station opened on 30 April 2010 along with five other stations along the already-operating Red Line and a westward extension to Ibn Battuta, also a new station.

Location
Located southwest of the historic centre of Dubai, Emirates Towers station lies between Bur Dubai and many of the city's larger new developments. To the east are the Emirates Towers and Museum of the Future, after which the station is named. Also nearby are numerous hotels.

Station layout
Like many other stations on the Red Line, Emirates Towers lies on a viaduct parallel to the east side of Sheikh Zayed Road. It is classified as a type 1 station, indicating a setup with a ground-level concourse and two elevated side platforms with two tracks.

References

Dubai Metro stations
Railway stations in the United Arab Emirates opened in 2010